The Sandbox is a 2D sandbox game for mobile phones (iOS and Android) and Microsoft Windows, developed by the game studio Pixowl and released on May 15, 2012. It was released for PC on Steam on 29 June 2015.

The brand was acquired by Animoca Brands in 2018, and its name was used for a blockchain-based 3D open world game of the same name that launched on November 29 2021.

Gameplay
The player takes the role of "Deity apprentice" and sets about crafting their own universe through the exploration of resources such as water, soil, lightning, lava, sand and glass. The user is given a single 2D screen as their canvas, and applies these resources as pixels. Once added to the screen, these resources interact in various ways, such as water mixing with sand to create mud, and lava burning other objects.

The game also includes  more complex elements such as humans, wildlife, and mechanical contraptions. The player is given challenges like making a battery or building an electrical circuit. Players can save worlds they have created and also upload them to a public gallery.

The game is free to play, with microtransactions required to unlock additional building elements.

Reviews
The 2015 edition of the game has a Metacritic score of 85% based on 7 critic reviews.

References

External links
 The Sandbox Evolution

2012 video games
Android (operating system) games
Construction and management simulation games
IOS games
Video games developed in the United States